The men's artistic gymnastics individual all-around competition at the 2015 European Games was held at the National Gymnastics Arena, Baku on 18 June 2015.

Qualification

The top 18 gymnasts with one per country qualified for the all-around final.

Results

References

All-around artistic gymnastics
Men's artistic individual all-around